Compass is the sixth album by American electronic act Assemblage 23.  It was released on October 1, 2009 on Metropolis Records and Accession Records.

Track listing
All songs written, performed and produced by Tom Shear

References

2009 albums
Assemblage 23 albums
Accession Records albums
Metropolis Records albums